James Hill Hunter (July 26, 1839 – February 2, 1891) was an Ontario merchant and political figure. He represented Grey South in the Legislative Assembly of Ontario as a Liberal from 1875 to 1883 and from 1890 to 1891.

He was born in Kilbarchan, Renfrewshire, Scotland in 1839, the son of Archibald Hunter and Elizabeth Hill, came to Canada West with his family in 1842 and was educated at Goderich and Upper Canada College. He became a merchant at Durham and also served as reeve for Glenelg Township. In 1863, he married Kate McDonald. Hunter died in office in 1891.

External links 
The Canadian parliamentary companion and annual register, 1882, CH Mackintosh

A History of the county of Grey, EL Marsh (1931)

1839 births
1891 deaths
Ontario Liberal Party MPPs
Scottish emigrants to pre-Confederation Ontario
Immigrants to the Province of Canada